Joypad  may refer to:
 gamepad, a type of game controller held in the hand, where the digits are used to provide input
 D-pad, a flat, usually thumb-operated directional control on most modern video game controllers and remote controllers
 , a monthly French gaming magazine published since 1991